FK Mokra Gora is a football club based in Zubin Potok, Kosovo. They compete in the Šumadija-Raška Zone League, the fourth tier of the national league system.

History
The club participated in the last two seasons of the Serbia and Montenegro Cup (2004–05 and 2005–06). They were eliminated in the opening round on each occasion, convincingly losing to Obilić (5–1) and OFK Beograd (3–0), respectively. In the 2006–07 Serbian Cup, the club would go on to defeat Borac Čačak in the first round on penalties. They subsequently played Red Star Belgrade and narrowly lost 2–1 to the eventual winners of the competition.

In the 2014–15 season, the club won the Morava Zone League and took promotion to the Serbian League West. They spent five seasons in the third tier of Serbian football, before being relegated to the Šumadija-Raška Zone League in 2020.

Honours
Morava Zone League (Tier 4)
 2014–15

Seasons

References

External links
 Club page at Srbijasport

1972 establishments in Serbia
Association football clubs established in 1972
Football clubs in Serbia
Football clubs in Kosovo
Zubin Potok